Carlos Victoriano Varela Cerezo (born 11 April 1963) is a Cuban singer-songwriter of Nueva Trova, a political and poetic musical genre. Nueva Trova began as a reaction to the unjust conditions that led to the Cuban Revolution in 1959. Varela joined the Nueva Trova musical movement in the 1980s while in his 20s. He has earned the nickname ("cariño" in Spanish) of "Nomo" (Gnome), due to the way he dresses.

Career 
Silvio Rodríguez, one of the most well-known founders of Nueva Trova, discovered Varela and took him on tour in Spain. His first CD, "Jalisco Park", was published there in 1989. 

Today Varela's music is known for its open criticism of the status quo in post-revolutionary Cuba, but is still considered part of the Nueva Trova movement and genre.

Singer-songwriter Jackson Browne translated Carlos Varela's song "Walls and Doors" into English for Browne's 2014 Standing In The Breach recording and tour. 

Varela's song "Una palabra" ("One Word") was used in the soundtrack of the film Powder Keg (2001) directed by Alejandro González Iñárritu starring Clive Owen, and again in the film Man on Fire in 2004 starring Denzel Washington and Dakota Fanning. It was also used in Episode 3 of Netflix's series, The Night Stalker: The Hunt for a Serial Killer.  He has integrated his music into the soundtracks of several Cuban films as well, such as Las profecías de Amanda ("The Prophesies of Amanda") and Video de familia ("Family Video"), among others.

Discography

References

External links

Carlos Varela Official site

1963 births
Cuban musicians
Living people